The 2021 season was the Buffalo Bills' 52nd in the National Football League, seventh full under the ownership of Terry and Kim Pegula, and their fifth under the head coach/general manager tandem of Sean McDermott and Brandon Beane.

Although unable to match their 13–3 record from the previous season, the Bills clinched the AFC East for a second consecutive year, their first consecutive division title since 1991. They finished the regular season at 11–6 to obtain the #3 seed for the playoffs, also marking their third consecutive postseason berth and fourth in five years. Statistically, the Bills had the No. 1-ranked defense, as well as the highest point differential and margin of victory. All of the team's victories were by multiple possessions, but they lost every game that was within one possession.

The Bills defeated their AFC East rival New England Patriots in the wild card round, a game marked by them becoming the first NFL team to score a touchdown on every offensive drive. Facing the Kansas City Chiefs in a Divisional Round matchup, the Bills lost amid a quarterback duel between Buffalo's Josh Allen and Kansas City's Patrick Mahomes. Although the Bills were able to take a three-point lead with 13 seconds remaining, the Chiefs scored a game-tying field goal on their following drive and won in overtime. The defeat marked the second consecutive year the Bills were eliminated by the Chiefs.

The season also saw Pittsburgh-based health insurance company Highmark purchase the rights to the Bills' stadium, resulting in it being named Highmark Stadium.

Draft

Notes
 The Bills received a fifth-round selection from the Las Vegas Raiders in exchange for wide receiver Zay Jones.
 The Bills got a conditional seventh-round selection from the Carolina Panthers in exchange for offensive tackle Marshall Newhouse.

Staff

Final roster

Preseason
The Bills preseason schedule was announced on May 12. They opened the preseason with a 16–15 road win against the Detroit Lions.

Regular season

Schedule
The Bills 2021 schedule was announced on May 12.

Note: Intra-division opponents are in bold text.

Game summaries

Week 1: vs. Pittsburgh Steelers

Despite a 10–0 halftime lead and a strong performance from the Buffalo defense, the Bills' hopes for a third straight Week 1 victory were dashed after Pittsburgh scored 20 unanswered points in the second half, including a blocked punt returned for a touchdown. The Bills were also hurt by several penalties throughout the game. With the loss, Buffalo began the season 0–1 for the first time since 2018.

Week 2: at Miami Dolphins

Buffalo rebounded from its loss the prior week with the most dominant win over division rival Miami in franchise history. Despite another mediocre performance by quarterback Josh Allen, a strong performance from running backs Devin Singletary and Zack Moss, as well as the defense, allowed the Bills to win 35–0. Dolphins quarterbacks Tua Tagovailoa and Jacoby Brissett were sacked six times, with Tagovailoa leaving the game in the first quarter after a rib injury.

Week 3: vs. Washington Football Team

Josh Allen and the Bills' passing game enjoyed a strong performance, as Allen accounted for five total touchdowns and surpassed 300 passing yards for the first time in the season. Aside from a 73-yard scoring reception by running back Antonio Gibson and two scores from quarterback Taylor Heinicke set up by a Buffalo special teams gaffe and garbage time, respectively, Washington's offense struggled against the Bills defense. With another win, Buffalo improved to 2–1.

Week 4: vs. Houston Texans

Buffalo faced Houston for the first time since a 22–19 overtime loss in the 2019–20 NFL playoffs. Despite an early interception, Allen completed two touchdown passes to tight end Dawson Knox and led the Bills to 33 points before backup Mitchell Trubisky was substituted on in the fourth quarter. The Bills defense limited the Texans' rookie quarterback Davis Mills, filling in for former Bills starter Tyrod Taylor, to just 87 passing yards and intercepted him four times. The Texans finished with just 109 total offensive yards. With the 40–0 victory, their second shutout win of the season, the Bills improved to 3–1.

Week 5: at Kansas City Chiefs

The Bills returned to Arrowhead Stadium for a Sunday night rematch of the previous season's AFC Championship game looking to avenge a 38–24 loss; in that same season, the Bills had also lost in the regular season to Kansas City. In a game nationally anticipated as a potential bellwether for AFC contention, the Bills scored 38 points, and they were dominant on both sides of the ball throughout the game. While Allen earned a 139.1 passer rating and threw for 315 yards (averaging 21 yards per pass completion), the Bills defense sacked Patrick Mahomes twice and forced him into three turnovers, with one being returned for a touchdown. The game was affected greatly by weather conditions, as a rain delay extended halftime by over an hour, and by numerous penalties, as the two teams combined for 158 penalty yards.

This was Buffalo's first win over Kansas City since 2017 and their first win with Mahomes as the Chiefs' starting quarterback. The win improved the Bills to 4–1.

Week 6: at Tennessee Titans

The Bills attempted to avenge a 42–16 loss to the Titans from the previous season, which was rescheduled several times due to a COVID-19 outbreak in the Titans organization. In the final moments of a back-and-forth shootout on Monday Night Football, in which the lead changed seven times, the Titans defensive line stopped Josh Allen on a fourth-down quarterback sneak at the Tennessee 3-yard line, and Buffalo narrowly lost 34–31, falling to 4–2 ahead of its bye week.

Week 8: vs. Miami Dolphins

The Dolphins, who entered the game at 1–6, dominated the time of possession in the first half and limited Buffalo's offense to a field goal; however, they also squandered two scoring opportunities in the red zone, culminating in a 3–3 tie at halftime. The Bills would score two unanswered touchdowns to Gabe Davis and Stefon Diggs after halftime en route to a 26–11 win, their seventh straight over Miami.

Week 9: at Jacksonville Jaguars

The Bills entered this game as 14.5-point favorites over the 1–6 Jacksonville Jaguars. Nevertheless, the game was a defensive struggle, with neither team finding the end zone. Despite outgaining Jacksonville by 83 yards, the Bills lost the turnover battle 1–3, with all of their turnovers coming from quarterback Josh Allen (two interceptions and a lost fumble). Allen was sacked four times for 35 yards, and Buffalo was penalized 12 times for 118 yards. After allowing field goals on each of their first two drives, the Jaguars defense had their way with the Bills offensive line, which was missing Jon Feliciano and Spencer Brown due to injury. Notably, Josh Allen's namesake on the Jaguars sacked, intercepted, and recovered a fumble from his Bills counterpart. Jacksonville pulled off one of the biggest upsets in NFL history, defeating the Bills 9–6 and winning their first game in North America since Week 1 of the 2020 season. With the stunning loss, Buffalo fell to 5–3, with their division lead over the New England Patriots shrinking to just half a game.

Week 10: at New York Jets

Buffalo rebounded against the divisional rival New York Jets, scoring six touchdowns after being held out of the endzone the week prior, with two of those touchdowns accounted for by third string running back Matt Breida. On defense, all five starting defensive backs for the Bills, namely Taron Johnson, Micah Hyde, Tre'Davious White, Levi Wallace, and Jordan Poyer, recorded a turnover off the Jets' offense, stifling quarterback Mike White. With the 45–17 win, Buffalo improved to 6–3.

Week 11: vs. Indianapolis Colts

The Bills defense, missing key run-stoppers Star Lotulelei and Tremaine Edmunds, struggled to contain Colts RB Jonathan Taylor, who scored five total touchdowns from scrimmage. To make matters worse, the Buffalo offense and special teams unit committed key turnovers, contributing to a 41–15 blowout loss. Buffalo fell to 6–4, also falling to second place in the AFC East as the Patriots had won earlier that week. This was the first NFL game to ever end in the score of 15–41, a scorigami.

Week 12: at New Orleans Saints
Thanksgiving Day games

In their second Thanksgiving Day game in three years, the Bills traveled south to play the injury-depleted Saints. Josh Allen continued to struggle with interceptions, throwing two in the second quarter, but also threw four touchdown passes, including two to Dawson Knox, as Buffalo routed New Orleans 31–6 to improve to 7–4. Unfortunately, they would also lose Tre'Davious White for the season to a torn ACL suffered during the game.

Week 13: vs. New England Patriots

In a game affected by winds greater than 40 miles per hour, divisional rival New England ran the ball 46 times and only threw three passes, accumulating over 200 rushing yards and just 19 passing yards. The Bills also tried a run-heavy approach but relied more on the passing game late in the game despite the heavy winds affecting several of Josh Allen's passes. New England never trailed after taking the early lead with a 64-yard rushing touchdown by Damien Harris, and Buffalo finished just 1 for 4 on redzone possessions, leading to a 14–10 loss to the Patriots.

Week 14: at Tampa Bay Buccaneers

The Buccaneers raced to a 24–3 halftime lead under former Patriots quarterback Tom Brady, along with a strong first-half performance by running back Leonard Fournette and a furious pass rush that largely shut down Josh Allen and the Bills' offense, which did not hand off the ball to a running back in the first half, the first time an NFL team had not done so since . However, the Bills mounted a comeback, outscoring Tampa Bay 24–3 in the second half, to force overtime. After a three and out on the first series of the extra period, a 63-yard punt from Matt Haack pushed Tampa Bay to its own 6-yard line. A controversial pass interference call on Levi Wallace allowed Tampa Bay to convert a 3rd-and-long, and the Buccaneers sealed the game minutes later with a 58-yard catch-and-run touchdown pass from Brady to Breshad Perriman, sending Buffalo to a 7–6 record with the loss. Allen became just the fourth quarterback in NFL history with 300 passing yards and 100 rushing yards in the same game, playing through a sprained ankle suffered in the fourth quarter.

Week 15: vs. Carolina Panthers

With the win, Buffalo snapped a two-game losing streak and improved to 8–6.

Week 16: at New England Patriots

Buffalo avenged its Monday Night loss to the Patriots earlier in December, as Josh Allen passed for over 300 yards and 3 touchdowns and was not sacked during the game. Despite receivers Cole Beasley and Gabe Davis coming down with COVID-19 and missing the game, utility player Isaiah McKenzie had a dominant performance in Beasley's place. New England relied heavily on its run game again, with Damien Harris scoring 3 touchdowns, but was forced to pass more with rookie quarterback Mac Jones, who completed less than 50 percent of his throws and was intercepted twice by Micah Hyde. With the 33–21 win, Buffalo improved to 9–6 and retook the division lead from New England.

Week 17: vs. Atlanta Falcons

Despite Allen turning in one of the worst passing performances of his career, he and running back Devin Singletary combined for four rushing touchdowns as Buffalo overcame 3 turnovers and a Falcons lead at halftime to win 29–15, clinching a playoff berth for the fourth time in five years.

Week 18: vs. New York Jets

The Bills held the lead the whole way during the game, holding the Jets offense to just 53 total yards on offense and recording nine quarterback sacks en route to a 27–10 win, which assured them the division title. Had they lost, they would have needed the Patriots to lose to Miami to clinch the division. A New England loss, combined with a subsequent victory by the Las Vegas Raiders late that night, sealed the 3rd seed for the Bills, and the Patriots as their opponent for the Wild Card game.

Standings

Division

Conference

Postseason

Schedule

Game summaries

AFC Wild Card Playoffs: vs. (6) New England Patriots

The Bills became the first team in the Super Bowl era to score a touchdown on each of their first seven drives of a playoff game. Additionally, they became the only team in NFL history to not attempt a field goal, punt, or commit a turnover in a single game (regular season or postseason).

AFC Divisional Playoffs: at (2) Kansas City Chiefs

After a back-and-forth first half, Kansas City took a 9-point lead in the third quarter with a Mecole Hardman rushing touchdown before Buffalo struck back on the next play with a 75-yard touchdown pass from Josh Allen to Gabe Davis. The Chiefs led 26–21 in the 4th quarter after Tyreek Hill set up a field goal with a 45-yard punt return. Allen then led the Bills on an 7-minute, 75-yard drive to retake the lead, scoring the first 8 points of 25 by both teams in the final two minutes of the game; the lead would change twice afterwards, with Kansas City and Buffalo scoring quick touchdowns within seconds of each other. 

Buffalo took a 36–33 lead with 13 seconds left, but controversially opted to eschew a squib kick for a traditional kickoff out of the endzone for a touchback setting up the Chiefs at their own 25-yard-line with all three of their timeouts remaining. Chiefs quarterback Patrick Mahomes completed a 19-yard pass to Hill that ran just 5 seconds off the clock, then threw a 25-yard pass to Travis Kelce, giving Kansas City a first down on the Bills 31-yard line after running down another 5 seconds. On the next play, Butker's 49-yard field goal sent the game into overtime.

Getting the ball first in overtime, Mahomes rushed for 4 yards and completed 5/5 passes for 50 yards, including a 16-yard pass to McKinnon and a 26-yard throw to Hardman. He finished the drive with an 8-yard touchdown pass to Kelce that sealed the win for Kansas City and eliminated the Bills from the playoffs for the second season in a row, ending their season.

Statistics

Team

Individual

Statistics correct as of the end of the 2021 NFL season

References

External links
 

Buffalo
Buffalo Bills seasons
AFC East championship seasons
Buffalo Bills